A Different World is an American sitcom television series and a spin-off of The Cosby Show. It aired for six seasons on NBC from September 24, 1987 to July 9, 1993. The series originally centered on Denise Huxtable (Lisa Bonet) and the life of students at Hillman College, a fictional historically black college in Virginia. It was inspired by student life at historically black colleges and universities.

After Bonet's departure in the first season, the remainder of the series primarily focused more on Southern belle Whitley Gilbert-Wayne (Jasmine Guy) and math whiz Dwayne Cleophus Wayne (Kadeem Hardison).

Concept
While it was a spin-off from The Cosby Show, A Different World typically addressed issues that were avoided by The Cosby Show writers (race and class relations, sexual assault, or the Equal Rights Amendment). One episode that aired in 1990 was one of the first American network television episodes to address the epidemiology of HIV/AIDS.

The original premise was to focus on a white student at a historically black university and feature Lena Horne as an acting teacher, but in production, the premise changed from being a story about a white student in a black college to a black student (Denise Huxtable) in a black college with a white friend. It was ultimately decided that Denise, who was of college age, would be spun off and have a white roommate in order to show the dynamic of a white girl in predominantly black surroundings.

Meg Ryan was originally cast for this role, but she decided to pursue a film career, so Marisa Tomei was cast. The first season of Hillman's student body consisted of both black and white students in equal numbers, but this was changed at the beginning of the second season and a predominantly black student body maintained until the series ended.

Season two changes
After the first season, it came to Cosby's and the producers' attention that the series was not accurately portraying a historically black college and life on campus, so Debbie Allen, an alumna of Howard University, was hired as the chief creative force to revamp the show. During the summer of 1988, Lisa Bonet announced that she and husband Lenny Kravitz were having a baby. Allen was in favor of having a young pregnant student in the show, but Cosby said that Lisa Bonet could be pregnant but not Denise Huxtable.

It was felt that viewers would not accept Denise as an unwed mother, having grown to know her as a "good girl" after four seasons of The Cosby Show. Thus it was decided that Denise would drop out of Hillman, return home to her family, and eventually travel to Africa throughout the fifth season of The Cosby Show, ensuring that viewers would not see a pregnant Denise. Allen was also in favor of keeping Tomei, as she herself recalled a white student at Howard and wanted to relate that in the show and even had possible premises for her character, such as meeting Dwayne's parents and seeing the other side of racism.

However, the network rejected this storyline and the producers released Tomei from the show, and she and Marie-Alise Recasner were replaced by Cree Summer and Charnele Brown, respectively. Darryl M. Bell and Sinbad were promoted to the principal cast, and Glynn Turman and Lou Myers were added as supporting cast members. These changes led to the placement of Whitley and Dwayne at the center of a wider ensemble.

Cast and characters

Main

Recurring
 Joe Morton as Byron Douglas (season 5) 
 Cory Tyler as Terrence Taylor (seasons 4 and 5)
 Patrick Malone as Terrell Walker (season 6)
 Bumper Robinson as Dorian Heywood (season 6)
 Michael Ralph as Spencer Boyer (season 6), various characters (seasons 4 and 5)
 Gary Dourdan as Shazza Zulu (seasons 5 and 6, guest starring in episode 86)
 Marie-Alise Recasner as Millie (season 1)
 Andrew Lowery as Matthew (Freddie's cousin/Kim's boyfriend; season 4)
 Kim Wayans as Allison (season 1)
 Dominic Hoffman as Ken Souje (Season 1), Julian Day (Whitley's boyfriend, 8 episodes)
 Alisa Gyse Dickens as Kinu Owens (Dwayne's girlfriend; 9 episodes)
 Jenifer Lewis as Dean Dorothy Dandridge Davenport (9 episodes)
 Diahann Carroll as Marion Gilbert (Whitley's mother; 7 episodes)
 Patti LaBelle as Adele Wayne (Dwayne's mother; 7 episodes)
 Roger Guenveur Smith as Prof. Howard Randolph (season 4)
 Rosalind Cash as Dean Hughes (4 episodes)
 Ron O'Neal as Mercer Gilbert (Whitley's father; 4 episodes)
 Phylicia Rashad as Clair Huxtable (4 episodes)
 Jonell Green as Dashawn Curtis (4 episodes)
 Bill Cosby as Cliff Huxtable (3 episodes)
 Keshia Knight Pulliam as Rudy Huxtable (3 episodes)
 Robert Guillaume as Dean Winston and Professor Murphy (history professor/Kim's medical professor; 3 episodes)
 Harold Sylvester as Woodson Wayne (Dwayne's father; 3 episodes)
 Malcolm-Jamal Warner as Theodore Huxtable (2 episodes)

Guest stars
 Vanessa Bell Calloway as Lily Connors (season 3, episode 18) & Jaleesa's sister (Danielle; season 4, episode 18)
 Tisha Campbell as Josie Webb (2 episodes)
 Nestor Carbonell as Malik Velasquez (Whitley's mother's hired "boyfriend"; 2 episodes)
 Art Evans as Mr. Johnson (Ron's father; 2 episodes)
 IMx as Whitley's students (2 episodes)
 Richard Roundtree as Clinton Reese (Kim's father; Season 3 episodes 8 & 9)
 Halle Berry as Jaclyn (Ron's girlfriend; season 4, episode 15)
 The Boys as Mice 2 Men (singing group; season 5, episode 13)
 Dean Cain as Eddie (A&M University student; season 5, episode 14)
 Wayne Federman as A&M Wolf (season 5, episode 14)
 Ernie Sabella as Campus Security (season 5, episode 14)
 En Vogue as Faith, Hope, Charity, and Henrietta (Mr. Gaines' nieces; season 6, episode 16)
 Whoopi Goldberg as Dr. Jordan (professor; season 4, episode 24)
 David Alan Grier as Professor Byron Walcott (season 1, episode 9)
 James Avery as bowler (season 3, episode 4)
 Alfonso Ribeiro as Zach Duncan (prospective freshman; season 3, episode 19)
 Heavy D as himself (season 3, episode 6)
 Lena Horne as herself (season 6, episode 25)
 Jesse Jackson as himself (season 2, episode 21)
 Trina McGee as Gennifer (season 5, episode 18)
 Khandi Alexander as Theressa Stone (season 2, episode 21)
 Gladys Knight as herself (season 2, episode 5)
 Kris Kross as Dwayne's juvenile mentees (season 6, episode 11)
 Tupac Shakur as Piccolo (season 6, episode 23)
 Obba Babatundé as Frank (season 3, episode 22)
 Blair Underwood as Zelmer Collier (season 4, episode 14)
 Billy Dee Williams as Langston Paige (landlord; season 6, episode 23)
 Thomas Mikal Ford as Lamar Vinson (Jaleesa's ex-husband, season 2, episode 17)
 Raven-Symoné as Olivia Kendall (Denise's step-daughter, season 3, episode 5)
 Joseph C. Phillips as Lt. Martin Kendall (Denise's husband, season 3 episode 5)

Episodes

Connections to The Cosby Show
As a show developed by Bill Cosby for a character from The Cosby Show, A Different World had many connections to its parent program, even before the latter program was created. The third season finale of The Cosby Show, entitled "Hillman", was essentially a pilot episode for the new show.

The theme song was co-written by Stu Gardner, Bill Cosby, and Dawnn Lewis – who was also a cast member. In the online interviews related to the 2006 "Hillman College Reunion", Lewis revealed that her being approached to write the song and to audition were two separate events that occurred within a short time of each other, such that she thought it was a practical joke by her friends.

The spin-off program featured many appearances by characters from the parent program, especially in the initial season, in which Denise's father Cliff Huxtable (Bill Cosby), mother Clair Huxtable (Phylicia Rashad), younger sisters Vanessa Huxtable (Tempestt Bledsoe) and Rudy, brother Theodore Huxtable (Malcolm-Jamal Warner), and grandfather Russell (Earle Hyman) all appeared on the show, either at Hillman or at the other end of a phone call. Denise's departure from Hillman after Season 1 did not stop her mother from reappearing on the show.

Three of Phylicia Rashad's four appearances as Hillman alumna Clair Huxtable took place after season one, and in one of these, she brought her younger daughter Vanessa to tour the college. Sondra (played by Sabrina Le Beauf in the parent series) was the only Huxtable child not to appear on the show. Martin (Joseph C. Phillips) and Olivia (Raven Symone) appear in season 3 episode "Forever Hold Your Peace", along with Phylicia Rashad and Lisa Bonet. Elvin (Geoffrey Owens) and Pam (Erika Alexander) also never appeared on the show.

Producer/director Debbie Allen is the real-life sister of Phylicia Rashad. Allen made one guest appearance on The Cosby Show, playing an aggressive aerobics instructor who helps Clair slim down for a special occasion. Allen appeared in later seasons in a recurring role as Whitley's psychiatrist. Dwayne and Whitley also visited the Huxtable home in an episode featuring the revelation that Denise had married and would not return to Hillman.

A young Kadeem Hardison appeared on The Cosby Show as one of Theo Huxtable's friends in the first-season episode "A Shirt Story", though not playing Dwayne.

Sinbad also appeared on The Cosby Show as a car salesman in third-season episode "Say Hello to a Good Buy".

A Hillman alumna by the name of "Louise Sujay" was mentioned on both Cosby and A Different World by Clair Huxtable, Whitley Gilbert and her mother Marion.

Like Lisa Bonet, Karen Malina White brought her The Cosby Show character to Hillman. Charmaine was the best friend of Claire Huxtable's cousin Pam Tucker. White's Cosby Show costar Allen Payne turned down an offer to bring his role as Charmaine's boyfriend Lance Rodman to A Different World as a regular during Season 6, preferring instead to pursue a movie career; he and Jada Pinkett Smith starred in the 1994 film Jason's Lyric, which is considered to be a milestone in both their careers.

Payne appeared in one episode during season five in which Charmaine visits Hillman as a prospective student, bringing Lance along to see if he can gain admission as well. When Charmaine arrives at Hillman, she and Lance are maintaining a long-distance relationship and he is mentioned in multiple episodes. Lance and Charmaine later break up over the phone.

Years later, Tempestt Bledsoe (who played Vanessa on Cosby) and Darryl M. Bell (who played Ron on A Different World) became a real-life couple and co-starred on the 2009 Fox Reality Channel series Househusbands of Hollywood.

Hillman College 
Hillman College is a fictional historically black college, founded in 1881 and located in the commonwealth of Virginia. The exact locality of the school is never revealed, but several geographic references are made which allude to the campus either being located somewhere in the Hampton Roads area or in the Roanoke Metropolitan Area. The school's motto is Deus Nondum Te Confecit, which literally translates from Latin to: God has not yet finished you. The school colors are maroon and gray. Visual shots of the Hillman campus that were used in the series were actually filmed at two real-life Black colleges, Clark Atlanta University and Spelman College, both in Atlanta, Georgia.

The first references to Hillman on The Cosby Show were made during season one, when it is mentioned as the place where Cliff Huxtable and Clair Hanks went to school while they were engaged. Cliff's father Russell is also a Hillman alumnus. The school made its first on-screen appearance in the third-season finale of The Cosby Show, titled "Hillman", when Cliff and Clair and their family attend a Hillman commencement ceremony which also honored a retiring professor.

Home media
Urban Works released Season 1 of A Different World on DVD in Region 1 on November 8, 2005. Several release dates for a Season 2 DVD were announced (May 2006, July 2006, and September 2006), but the DVD was never released. Urban Works was acquired by First Look Studios in early 2006. The distribution rights for the series have since reverted to the production company, Carsey-Werner Productions. FilmRise has currently made the series available on streaming services, especially Amazon Prime.

Reception

Ratings
Critics say that A Different World benefited from airing between The Cosby Show and Cheers on Thursday night.  The show consistently ranked first or second among African American viewers during most of its run.

Media reaction
The Hollywood Reporter is quoted as stating that when Debbie Allen became the producer (and usually director) of A Different World after the first season, she transformed it "from a bland Cosby spin-off into a lively, socially responsible, ensemble situation comedy."

The Museum of Broadcast Communications states that Debbie Allen:

a graduate of historically black Howard University – drew from her college experiences in an effort to accurately reflect in the show the social and political life on black campuses. Moreover, Allen instituted a yearly spring trip to Atlanta where series writers visited three of the nation's leading black colleges, Clark Atlanta, Morehouse and Spelman. During these visits, ideas for several of the episodes emerged from meetings with students and faculty.

On August 23 and 24, 2012, Debbie Allen, the former chief creative force of A Different World from 1988 to 1993, wrote on Twitter that she wanted to reboot the series. Over a million people on Facebook, Twitter and blogs reacted to the tweet and approve the potential reboot.

Impact on African-American culture
Because of Debbie Allen's influence as the producer (and usually director) of A Different World after the first season, African-American youth who watched the show often cite it as a defining reason why many of them decided to attend a historically Black college or university.

Hillman College Reunion
In August 2006, Nick at Nite aired a week-long marathon showing episodes of A Different World. Lisa Bonet, Dawnn Lewis, Jasmine Guy, Kadeem Hardison, Darryl M. Bell, Cree Summer, and Sinbad reunited for short vignettes that provided a glimpse of the current state of their characters. Nick at Nite's "Hillman College Reunion" website added details beyond those shown on television.

See also 

 Historically black colleges and universities
 List of highest-rated television pilots  On September 24, 1987, the pilot episode of A Different World became the highest-rated television pilot in history.

Notes

References

External links
 Carsey Werner - A Different World
 A Different World at the Museum of Broadcast Communications
 Official Bill Cosby website
 
 
 

1980s American black sitcoms
1980s American college television series
1980s American sitcoms
1987 American television series debuts
1990s American black sitcoms
1990s American college television series
1990s American sitcoms
1993 American television series endings
American television spin-offs
English-language television shows
NBC original programming
Television series by Carsey-Werner Productions
Television series created by Bill Cosby
Television shows set in Virginia
The Cosby Show